A mora (plural morae or moras; often symbolized μ) is a basic timing unit in the phonology of some spoken languages, equal to or shorter than a syllable. For example, a short syllable such as ba consists of one mora (monomoraic), while a long syllable such as baa consists of two (bimoraic); extra-long syllables with three moras (trimoraic) are relatively rare. Such metrics are also referred to as syllable weight.

The term comes from the Latin word for 'linger, delay', which was also used to translate the Greek word  :   ('time') in its metrical sense.

Formation
The general principles for assigning moras to segments are as follows (see Hayes 1989 and Hyman 1985 for detailed discussion):

 A syllable onset (the first consonant or consonants of the syllable) does not represent any mora.
 The syllable nucleus represents one mora in the case of a short vowel, and two morae in the case of a long vowel or diphthong. Consonants serving as syllable nuclei also represent one mora if short and two if long. Slovak is an example of a language that has both long and short  consonantal nuclei.
 In some languages (for example, Latin and Japanese), the coda represents one mora, and in others (for example, Irish) it does not. In English, the codas of stressed syllables represent a mora (thus, the word cat is bimoraic), but 
 In some languages, a syllable with a long vowel or diphthong in the nucleus and one or more consonants in the coda is said to be trimoraic (see pluti).

In general, monomoraic syllables are called "light syllables", bimoraic syllables are called "heavy syllables", and trimoraic syllables (in languages that have them) are called "superheavy syllables". Some languages, such as Old English and present-day English, can have syllables with up to four morae.

A prosodic stress system in which moraically heavy syllables are assigned stress is said to have the property of quantity sensitivity.

Languages

Ancient Greek

For the purpose of determining accent in Ancient Greek, short vowels have one mora, and long vowels and diphthongs have two morae. Thus long ē can be understood as a sequence of two short vowels: ee.

Ancient Greek pitch accent is placed on only one mora in a word. An acute represents high pitch on the only mora of a short vowel or the last mora of a long vowel (é, eé). A circumflex represents high pitch on the first mora of a long vowel (ée).

English
In Old English, short diphthongs and monophthongs were monomoraic, long diphthongs and monophthongs were bimoraic, consonants ending a syllable were each one mora, and geminate consonants added a mora to the preceding syllable. In Modern English, the rules are similar, except that all diphthongs are bimoraic. In English, and probably also in Old English, syllables cannot have more than four morae, with loss of sounds occurring if a syllable would have more than 4 otherwise. From the Old English period through to today, all content words must be at least two morae long.

Gilbertese
Gilbertese, an Austronesian language spoken mainly in Kiribati, is a trimoraic language. The typical foot in Gilbertese contains three morae. These trimoraic constituents are units of stress in Gilbertese. These "ternary metrical constituents of the sort found in Gilbertese are quite rare cross-linguistically, and as far as we know, Gilbertese is the only language in the world reported to have a ternary constraint on prosodic word size."

Hawaiian
In Hawaiian, both syllables and morae are important. Stress falls on the penultimate mora, though in words long enough to have two stresses, only the final stress is predictable. However, although a diphthong, such as oi, consists of two morae, stress may fall only on the first, a restriction not found with other vowel sequences such as io. That is, there is a distinction between oi, a bimoraic syllable, and io, which is two syllables.

Japanese

Writing Japanese in kana (hiragana and katakana) is said by those scholars who use the term mora to demonstrate a moraic system of writing. For example, in the two-syllable word , the ō is a long vowel and counts as two morae. Therefore, scholars argue that the 5/7/5 pattern of the haiku in modern Japanese is of morae rather than syllables.

The Japanese syllable-final n is also said to be moraic, as is the first part of a geminate consonant. For example, the Japanese name for Japan, has two different pronunciations, one with three morae and one with four.

Similarly, the names Tōkyō, Ōsaka, and Nagasaki all have four morae, even though, on this analysis, they can be said to have two, three and four syllables, respectively.

There is a unique set of  known as "special mora" which cannot be pronounced by itself but still counts as one mora whenever present. These consist of "nasal sound" represented by the kana for n, the "geminate consonant" represented by the small tsu, the "long sound" represented by the long vowel symbol or a single vowel which extends the sound of the previous  and the "diphthong" represented by the second vowel of two consecutive vowels.

This set also has the peculiarity that the drop in pitch of a word (so-called "downstep") can not fall on any of these "special mora" under any conditions, which is especially useful for learners of the language trying to learn the accent of words.

Luganda
In Luganda, a short vowel constitutes one mora while a long vowel constitutes two morae. A simple consonant has no morae, and a doubled or prenasalised consonant has one. No syllable may contain more than three morae. The tone system in Luganda is based on morae. See Luganda tones and Luganda grammar.

Sanskrit
For example, the short vowel a (pronounced like a schwa) is assigned a value of one , the long vowel  is assigned a value of two s, and the compound vowel (diphthong) ai (which has either two simple short vowels, a+i, or one long and one short vowel, ā+i) is assigned a value of two s.

Sanskrit prosody and metrics have a deep history of taking into account moraic weight, as it were, rather than straight syllables, divided into  ('light') and / (/, 'heavy') feet based on how many morae can be isolated in each word. Thus, for example, the word , meaning 'agent' or 'doer', does not contain simply two syllabic units, but contains rather, in order, a / foot and a  foot. The reason is that the conjoined consonants rt render the normally light ka syllable heavy.

See also
 Chroneme
 Compensatory lengthening
 Dreimorengesetz
 On (Japanese prosody)
 Pitch accent
 Syllable

Notes

References

 

 
 LCCN

External links 
 

Phonology
Psycholinguistics